An electric dragbike is an electric motorcycle used for drag racing.

Electric dragsters have come of age with new developments in battery and motor technology. Electric motors powered by lithium cells can deliver power-to-weight ratios similar to high performance gasoline engines. Drag races last around ten seconds so battery range is not an issue. A number of electric dragbikes and dragsters (cars) are competing with Top Fuel classes.  Electric drag racing records are listed at NEDRA.

Batteries
Electric dragbike tend to use lithium-ion or nickel-metal hydride cells due to their higher energy density which means they are less bulky to carry. In addition fewer cells are needed compared to a car as the "payload" of bike and rider is lighter. Typical weights:  rider,  bike excluding battery weight.

See also
Electric drag racing
Team killacycle Killacycle electric Dragbike

References

External links
http://projectblackswan.wikispaces.com/
http://www.killacycle.com/
http://www.nedra.com/
https://www.truecousins.dk/edragracing/index.html

Motorcycle drag racing
Electric motorcycles
Electric drag racing